Lyubcha is a village in southwestern Bulgaria. It is located in the municipality of Dospat, Smolyan Province.

Geography 

The village of Lyubcha is located in the Western Rhodope Mountains. It is situated in the Chech region.

History 

According to Vasil Kanchov, in 1900 Lyubcha was populated by 320 Bulgarian Muslims.

Religion 

The population is Muslim. Most inhabitants of the village are Pomaks.

Sights 
 Roman-style bridge

Notes 

Villages in Smolyan Province
Chech